is a Shinto shrine located in Chiyoda, Tokyo. It was founded by Emperor Meiji in June 1869 and commemorates those who died in service of Japan, from the Boshin War of 1868–1869, to the two Sino-Japanese Wars, 1894–1895 and 1937–1945 respectively, and the First Indochina War of 1946–1954, including war criminals. The shrine's purpose has been expanded over the years to include those who died in the wars involving Japan spanning from the entire Meiji and Taishō periods, and the earlier part of the Shōwa period.  

The shrine lists the names, origins, birthdates, and places of death of 2,466,532 men, women, children, and various pet animals. Among those are 1,068 convicted war criminals, 14 of whom are A-Class (convicted of having been involved in the planning, preparation, initiation, or waging of the war). This has led to many controversies surrounding the shrine. Another memorial at the Honden (main hall) building commemorates anyone who died on behalf of Japan, and so includes Koreans and Taiwanese who served Japan at the time. In addition, the Chinreisha ("Spirit Pacifying Shrine") building is a shrine built to inter the souls of all the people who died during WWII, regardless of their nationality. It is located directly south of the Yasukuni Honden.

Japanese soldiers fought World War II in the name of Emperor Shōwa, who visited the shrine eight times between the end of the war and 1975. However, he stopped visiting the shrine because of his displeasure over the enshrinement of top convicted war criminals. His successors Akihito and Naruhito have never visited the shrine.

Various Shinto festivals are associated with the shrine, particularly in the spring and autumn seasons when portable Mikoshi shrines are rounded about honoring the ancestral gods of Japan. A notable image of the shrine is the Japanese Imperial Chrysanthemum featured on the gate curtains leading into the shrine. The current 13th High Priest incumbent of the shrine is Tatebumi Yamaguchi, who was appointed on 1 November 2018 after Kunio Kobori.

History

Foundation for the dead in the Boshin War and Meiji Restoration

The site for the Yasukuni Shrine, originally named , was chosen by order of the Meiji Emperor. The shrine was established in 1869, in the wake of the Boshin War, in order to honor the souls of those who died fighting for the Emperor. It initially served as the "apex" of a network of similar shrines throughout Japan that had originally been established for the souls of various feudal lords' retainers, and which continued to enshrine local individuals who died in the Emperor's service. Following the 1877 Satsuma Rebellion, the Emperor had 6,959 souls of war dead enshrined at Tōkyō Shōkonsha. In 1879, the shrine was renamed Yasukuni Jinja. The name Yasukuni, quoted from the phrase「 in the classical-era Chinese text Zuo Zhuan (Scroll 6, 23rd Year of Duke Xi), literally means "Pacifying the Nation" and was chosen by the Meiji Emperor.
 Among the enshrined are Yoshida Shōin, Sakamoto Ryōma, Takasugi Shinsaku, Nakaoka Shintarō, Takechi Hanpeita, Sanai Hashimoto, and Ōmura Masujirō, who contributed to the Tokugawa shogunate's overthrow and the Meiji Restoration during the Bakumatsu period in Japan. In contrast, the shrine does not enshrine the war dead of shogunate retainers such as the soldiers of the former Shogunate forces, the Ouetsu Reppan Domei, the Shinsengumi, and the Shogitai.
 Although Saigō Takamori, Eto Shinpei, and Maebara Issei made a contribution to the Meiji Restoration, they were not enshrined because they revolted against the Meiji government after that.

From First Sino-Japanese War to Second Sino-Japanese War
The enshrinement of war dead at Yasukuni was transferred to military control in 1887. As the Empire of Japan expanded, Okinawans, Ainu, and Koreans were enshrined at Yasukuni alongside ethnic Japanese. Emperor Meiji refused to allow the enshrinement of Taiwanese due to the organized resistance that followed the Treaty of Shimonoseki, but Taiwanese were later admitted due to the need to conscript them during World War II.
In 1932, two Sophia University (Jochi Daigaku) Catholic students refused visit to Yasukuni Shrine on the grounds that it was contrary to their religious convictions. In 1936, the Society for the Propagation of the Faith (Propaganda Fide) of the Roman Curia issued the Instruction Pluries Instanterque, and approved visits to Yasukuni Shrine as an expression of patriotic motive. This response of the Catholic Church helped the Jesuit university avoid a fateful crisis, but it meant its bowing down to the military power and control by Emperor system.

During World War II and the GHQ occupation period
By the 1930s, the military government sought centralized state control over memorialization of the war dead, giving Yasukuni a more central role. Enshrinements at Yasukuni were originally announced in the government's official gazette so that the souls could be treated as national heroes, but this practice ended in April 1944, and the identities of the spirits were subsequently concealed from the general public. The shrine had a critical role in military and civilian morale during the war era as a symbol of dedication to the Emperor. Enshrinement at Yasukuni signified meaning and nobility to those who died for their country. During the final days of the war, it was common for soldiers sent on kamikaze suicide missions to say that they would "meet again at Yasukuni" following their death. After World War II, the US-led Occupation Authorities (known as GHQ for General Headquarters) issued the Shinto Directive, which ordered the separation of church and state and forced Yasukuni Shrine to become either a secular government institution or a religious institution independent from the Japanese government. Yasukuni Shrine has been privately funded and operated since 1946, when it was elected to become an individual religious corporation independent of the Association of Shinto Shrines. The GHQ planned to burn down the Yasukuni Shrine and build a dog race course in its place. However, Father Bruno Bitter of the Roman Curia and Father Patrick Byrne of Maryknoll insisted to GHQ that honoring their war dead is the right and duty of citizens everywhere, and GHQ decided not to destroy the Yasukuni shrine. Moreover, the Roman Curia reaffirmed the Instruction Pluries Instanterque in 1951.

Post-war issues and controversies

Enshrinement of war criminals 
The shrine authorities and the Ministry of Health and Welfare established a system in 1956 for the government to share information with the shrine regarding deceased war veterans. Most of Japan's war dead who were not already enshrined at Yasukuni were enshrined in this manner by April 1959. War criminals prosecuted by the International Military Tribunal for the Far East were initially excluded from enshrinement after the war. Government authorities began considering their enshrinement, along with providing veterans' benefits to their survivors, following the signature of the Treaty of San Francisco in 1951, and in 1954 directed some local memorial shrines to accept the enshrinement of war criminals from their area. No convicted war criminals were enshrined at Yasukuni until after the parole of the last remaining incarcerated war criminals in 1958. The Health and Welfare Ministry began forwarding information on Class B and Class C war criminals (those not involved in the planning, preparation, initiation, or waging of the war) to Yasukuni Shrine in 1959, and these individuals were gradually enshrined between 1959 and 1967, often without permission from surviving family members. 

Information on the fourteen most prominent Class A war criminals, which included the prime ministers and top generals from the war era, was forwarded to the shrine in 1966, and the shrine passed a resolution to enshrine these individuals in 1970. The timing for their enshrinement was left to the discretion of head priest Fujimaro Tsukuba, who delayed the enshrinement through his death in March 1978. His successor Nagayoshi Matsudaira, who rejected the Tokyo war crimes tribunal's verdicts, enshrined the Class A war criminals in a secret ceremony in 1978. Emperor Shōwa, who visited the shrine as recently as 1975, was privately displeased with the action, and subsequently refused to visit the shrine. The details of the enshrinement of war criminals eventually became public in 1979, but there was minimal controversy about the issue for several years. No Emperor of Japan has visited Yasukuni since 1975. 

The head-priest Junna Nakata at Honzen-ji Temple (of the Shingon sect Daigo-ha) requested the pontiff Pope Paul VI to say a Mass for the repose of the souls of all people in the Yasukuni, which would include the 1,618 men condemned as Class A, B and C war criminals, and he promised to do so. In 1980, Pope John Paul II complied, and a Mass was held in St. Peter's Basilica for all the fallen civilians and fallen dead worshiped in the shrine.

Statements by the shrine museum 
The museum and website of the Yasukuni Shrine have made statements criticizing the United States for "convincing" the Empire of Japan to launch the attack on Pearl Harbor just in order to justify war with them, as well as claiming that Japan went to war with the intention of creating a "Co-Prosperity Sphere" for all Asians.

Chronology
See details on related controversy in Controversies surrounding Yasukuni Shrine.

 1862 
The Saijin (deities) enshrined in the Shindō Sōsaijō Reimeisha are three kami including .
 1868
 January — (Tenpō calendar): The Boshin War started and continued until May, 1869 (Tenpō calendar)
 April 28 (Tenpō calendar): The tasshi by the Tōkaidō Senpō Sōtokufu decided to hold 
 May 10 (Tenpō calendar): The Dajokan Fukoku (Proclamation or Decree by the Grand Council of State) ordered the enshrinement of the war dead at Higashiyama-ku, Kyoto (Current Kyoto Ryozen Gokoku Shrine).
 June 2 (Tenpō calendar): The Shōkonsai was held at Nishi-no-maru ōhiroma of Edo Castle
 1869
 July 12 (Tenpō calendar): The tasshi by the Gunmukan ordered the establishment of Tōkyō Shōkonsha
 July: The 1st  (a festival held for enshrining the war dead together) (Number of newly enshrined: 3,588)
 1870: The Shōkonsha horse trackrace was established as the first Japanese racetrack in the country along the outside of the shrine approach
 1872 May 10 (Tenpo calendar): The establishment of the honden
 1874
 February: The Japanese invasion of Taiwan (1874)
 Emperor Meiji paid respect at the Yasukuni shrine. Since then, royal visit had been paid intermittently until 1975
 August: The 2nd Gōshisai (Number of newly enshrined: 192)
 November: The 3rd Gōshisai (Number of newly enshrined: 16)
 1875
 February 22: 
 February: The 4th Gōshisai (Number of newly enshrined: 12)
 July: 5th Gōshisai (Number of newly enshrined: 1)
 1876 January: The 6th Gōshisai (Number of newly enshrined: 1)
 1877
 January: The 7th Gōshisai (Number of newly enshrined: 131)
 February: Seinan War
 November 14: Rinjisai
 November: The 8th Gōshisai (Number of newly enshrined: 6,505)
 1878
 July: The 9th Gōshisai (Number of newly enshrined: 160)
 November: The 10th Gōshisai (Number of newly enshrined: 4)
 1879
 June 4: The shrine was registered to Bekkaku-kanpeisya and renamed Yasukuni shrine by Dajōan.
 June: The 11th Gōshisai (Number of newly enshrined: 266)
 1882
 February: The inauguration of Yūshūkan (the oldest military museum in the world)
 November: The 12th Gōshisai (Number of newly enshrined: 12)
 1883 May: The 13th Gōshisai (Number of newly enshrined: 80)
 1884 November: The 14th Gōshisai (Number of newly enshrined: 47)
 1885 May: The 15th Gōshisai (Number of newly enshrined: 6)
 1888
 May: The 16th Gōshisai (Number of newly enshrined: 607)
 November: The 17th Gōshisai (Number of newly enshrined: 18)
 1889
 May: The 18th Gōshisai (Number of newly enshrined: 1,460)
 November: The 19th Gōshisai (Number of newly enshrined: 61)
 1891 November: The 20th Gōshisai (Number of newly enshrined: 1,272)
 1893 November: The 21st Gōshisai (Number of newly enshrined: 80)
 1894 August: The First Sino-Japanese War started and continued until April 1895.
 1895
 November 17: 
 November: The 22nd Gōshisai (Number of newly enshrined: 1,496)
 1896
 May 6: Rinjitaisai
 May: The 23rd Gōshisai (Number of newly enshrined: 143)
 November: The 24th Gōshisai (Number of newly enshrined: 97)
 1898
 November 5: Rinjitaisai
 November: The 25th Gōshisai (Number of newly enshrined: 11,383)
 : The closure of the horse racetrack
 1899
 May: The 26th Gōshisai (Number of newly enshrined: 340)
 November: The 27th Gōshisai (Number of newly enshineed: 83)
 1900
 May: The 28th Gōshisai (Number of newly enshrined: 35)
 May: The Boxer Rebellion (to September)
 1901
 October 31: Rinjitaisai
 October: The establishment of the haiden
 November: 29th Gōshisai (Number of newly enshrined: 1,282)
 1904
 February: The Russo-Japanese War (until September 1904)
 May: The 30th Rinjitaisai
 May: The 31st Gōshisai (Number of newly enshrined: 30,883)
 1906
 May 2: Rinjitaisai
 May: The 32nd Gōshisai (Number of newly enshrined: 29,960)
 1907
 May 3: Rinjitaisai
 May: The 33rd Gōshisai (Number of newly enshrined: 24,657)
 1908
 May 5: Rinjitaisai
 May: The 34th Gōshisai (Number of newly enshrined: 1,943)
 1909
 May 5: Rinjitaisai
 May: The 35th Gōshisai (Number of newly enshrined: 817)
 1910
 May 5: Rinjitaisai
 May: The 36th Gōshisai (Number of newly enshrined: 141)
 1911
 May 5: Rinjitaisai
 May: The 37th Gōshisai (Number of newly enshrined: 631, Total: 118,499)
 1914 July: World War I (to October 1918)
 1919 May: The festival marking the 50th anniversary of the foundation
 1920 March: The Nikolayevsk Incident
 1923 September: The Great Kanto earthquake
 1928 May: The Jinan Incident
 1931 March: The  of the Fukuba family was transferred to inside the Yasukuni precinct as Motomiya.
 1932: The incident between Sophia University (Jochi Daigaku) and the Yasukuni Shrine occurred, when a student refused visit to the Yasukuni shrine with the rest of the school on the ground that it was contrary to his religious convictions.
 1936: The Congregation for the Evangelization of Peoples (Propaganda Fide) of the Roman Curia issued the Instruction Pluries Instanterque, and approved visit to the Yasukuni shrine as an expression of patriotic motive
 1938 April: Establishment of the new Shōkonsaitei
 1937 July: The Second Sino-Japanese War
 1941 December 8: Pacific War (continued to 1945)
 1945
 August 15: Emperor Shōwa gave a recorded radio address across the Empire on August 15. In the radio address, called the Gyokuon-hōsō, he announced the surrender of Japan to the Allies.
 October: The General Headquarters (GHQ) planned to burn down the Yasukuni Shrine and build a dog race course in its place. However, Father Bruno Bitter of the Roman Curia and Father Patrick Byrne of Maryknoll insisted to GHQ that honoring their war dead is the right and duty of citizens everywhere, and GHQ decided not to destroy the Yasukuni shrine.
 November 19: Rinji Dai-Shōkonsai
 December: The Shinto Directive
 1946
 May 1: The 67th Gōshisai (Number of newly enshrined: 26,969)
 September: Yasukuni Shrine was registered as a Religious Corporation of Japan.
 1947
 The Gōshisai (Number of newly enshrined: 59,337)
 July 13: The 1st Mitama Matsuri。
 1951
 April 3: The enforcement of the Religious Corporation Act
 October 18: The first Reitaisai after WWII
 The Roman Curia reconfirmed the Instruction Pluries Instanterque
 1952 April 28: The Treaty of San Francisco came into force.
 1955
 August 14: A memorial service was held for 540 suicide victims after the end of the Pacific war.
 October 17: Rinjitaisai
 1956: Gōshisai (Number of newly enshrined: 112,609)
 1957: Gōshisai (Number of newly enshined: 470,010)
 1958: Gōshisai (Number of newly enshrined: 217,536)
 1959
 April 8: Rinjitaisai
 April: Gōshisai (Number of newly enshrined: 346 dead including the class B and C war criminals who died from the death sentence execution)
 October 4: Gōshisai (Prince Kitashirakawa Yoshihisa and Prince Nagahisa Kitashirakawa)
 October: Gōshisai (Number of newly enshrined: 479 dead including the class B and C war criminals who died from the death sentence execution)
 November 5: Taisai (festival) marking the 90th anniversary of the foundation
 1960 August 15:  (the memorial service to honor the war dead in the Asia-Pacific War)
 1964 August 15: Holding of a government-sponsored memorial ceremony for Japan's war dead (the ceremony has been held at the Budokan since 1965)
 1965
 July: The establishment of Chinreisha
 October 19: Rinjitaisai
 1972 March 13: The establishment of 
 1975
 August 15: Takeo Miki became the first prime minister to visit the shrine on August 15, the anniversary of the Japanese surrender. He visited in a solely private capacity and underscored this by not using an official vehicle, bringing other public officials or using his title as prime minister. Similar visits continued without arousing international protests even after the enshrinement of war criminals became publicly known.
 November 21: Emperor Shōwa visited the Yasukuni shrine. Since then, there has not been another imperial visit to the shrine because of his displeasure over the enshrinement of convicted war criminals.
 The head-priest at the Honsenji (the Shingon sect Daigo-ha) Junna Nakata hoped that the pontiff Pope Paul VI might say a Mass for the repose of the souls of the 1,618 men condemned as Class A, B and C war criminals, and the Pope promised to say the Mass requested of him but died in 1978 without saying the Mass.
 1978 October 17: Gōshisai was held to enshrine 14 dead who died from the death penalty execution of the International Military Tribunal for the Far East or died in connection with the Tribunal. Since then, the Yasukuni shrine has used the designation  (Martyrs of Shōwa).
 1980
 May 22: Pope John Paul II kept Pope Paul VI's word, and the Mass for the fallen civilians and fallen dead worshiped in the shrine including the unofficial 1,618 war criminals of Classes A, B and C took place in St. Peter's Basilica. Nakata attended the Mass, and presented the Pope with an eight-foot high replica of the Daigoji temple's five-story pagoda; inside the replica were memorial tablets Nakata had personally made for all 1,618 war criminals. The Pope blessed the replica pagoda but took no special interest in it.
 November 16: The establishment of 
 1985
 August 15: Prime Minister Yasuhiro Nakasone paid his respects at the Yasukuni shrine, which initiated criticism by People's Republic of China for the first time. The criticism of Nakasone's action was so intense that neither he nor his several immediate successors visited the shrine again.
 September: The 80th anniversary commemorating and honoring the Russo-Japanese War dead
 1989 January: Taisai (festival) marking the 120th anniversary of the foundation
 1996 Prime minister Ryutaro Hashimoto paid his respects at the Yasukuni shrine in order to fulfill a promise to a childhood mentor.
 2001
 July 18: The Asahi Shimbun reported that the South Korean government was reclaiming spirit tablets of Korean enshrined in the Yasukuni shrine even though Yasukuni shrine houses only  (Former ) and spirit tablets do not exist.
 August 13: Prime Minister Junichiro Koizumi, who ran against Ryutaro Hashimoto for the presidency of the Liberal Democratic Party in 2001, made a campaign pledge to visit the shrine on an annual basis regardless of the criticism it would cause, which won him support among nationalists and helped him become prime minister from 2001 to 2006. He paid his respect at the Yasukuni shrine on August 13, 2001, as a Prime Minister for the first time in 5 years since the last Hashimoto's visit. This and following Koizumi's annual visits drew extensive criticism from other East-Asian countries, particularly the People's Republic of China, where the visits stoked anti-Japanese sentiment and influenced power struggles between pro-Japanese and anti-Japanese leaders within the Chinese Communist Party. The Japanese government officially viewed the visits by Koizumi as private visits in an individual capacity to express respect and gratitude to the many people who lost their lives in the war, and not for the sake of war criminals or to challenge the findings of the Tokyo war crimes tribunal.
 2002
 April 21: Prime Minister Junichiro Koizumi paid respect at the Yasukuni shrine.
 July 13: The inauguration of the current Yūshūkan
 2003 January 14: Prime Minister Junichiro Koizumi paid respect at the Yasukuni shrine.
 2004
 January 1: Prime Minister Junichiro Koizumi paid respect at the Yasukuni shrine.
 September: The establishment of new "Sanshūden"
 2005
 January 5: A Yasukuni shrine official said "the shrine has come under intense cyber attack, with its Web site barraged by e-mails believed to come from China since September 2004." The shrine also said on its official web site "These attacks on the Yasukuni Shrine can be taken as not only attacks on the 2.5 million souls who gave their lives for the sake of the country but are also a malicious challenge to Japan. We would like to let the people [of Japan] know the Yasukuni Shrine is under attack, which is a dirty act of terrorism that negates the order of Internet technology and society."
 June 14: About fifty relatives of the war dead of Taiwan visited the Yasukuni shrine for the ceremony to remove spirits of Taiwanese Aboriginal soldiers, but canceled it due to sound trucks (gaisensha) and requests from the police.
 October 12: A brief ceremony attended by priests of the Yasukuni shrine, representatives of the Japanese Ministry of Foreign Affairs and officials from the embassy of South Korea was held, and the Pukkwan Victory Monument  was turned over to officials from South Korea, who returned it to its original location, which is now in North Korea.
 October 17: Prime Minister Junichiro Koizumi paid respect at the Yasukuni shrine.
 2006
 August 15: Prime Minister Junichiro Koizumi paid respect at the Yasukuni shrine on August 15 (End of the Pacific War Day) for the first time in 21 years since Former Prime Minister Yasuhiro Nakasone's visit on August 15.
 October 12: The Motomiya and Chinreisha became open to the public (9 a.m. to 4 p.m.)
 2007 June 7: Former leader of Taiwan Lee Teng-Hui paid respect at the Yasukuni shrine to honor his senior brother who died as a Japanese soldier.
 2008 December 24: The Yasukuni official website was cracked by unknown hackers, the homepage content replaced, and the China national flag appeared once during this time.
 2009 August 11: The Republic of China (Taiwan) Legislative Yuan Aboriginal Atayal member Ciwas Ali and about 50 other Taiwanese Aboriginal members protested in front of the haiden of Yasukuni Shrine in an effort to remove the enshrined spirits of Taiwanese Aboriginal soldiers who died fighting for the Japanese army during Pacific War, as well as suing Japanese Prime Minister Junichiro Koizumi for visiting Yasukuni Shrine, and injured Yasukuni officers; then Japanese police officers were dispatched.
 2010 August 15: Longstanding official visit to the Yasukuni shrine by the ministers of state discontinued until 2012.
 2011
 December 26: The  was set on fire by a Chinese man, Liu Qiang.
 May 14 : President of the World Uyghur Congress Rebiya Kadeer visited the Yasukuni Shrine
 August 15: The Ministry of Land, Infrastructure, Transport and Tourism Yuichiro Hata and the National Public Safety Commission Jin Matsubara (Minister of State for Special Missions) paid respects at the Yasukuni Shrine as state ministers for the first time since the Democratic Party of Japan assumed the reins of government.
 2013
 April: The Minister of Finance Tarō Asō, the National Public Safety Commission Keiji Furuya, the Minister for Internal Affairs and Communications Yoshitaka Shindo, and the Minister of State for Regulatory Reform Tomomi Inada paid their respects at the Yasukuni shrine during an annual spring festival ceremony.
 August 15: Three cabinet members, Keiji Furuya, Yoshitaka Shindo, and Tomomi Inada, paid their respects at the Yasukuni shrine.
 September 21: A Korean resident of Japan threatened to commit arson at Yasukuni shrine, and was arrested by Police.
 December 26: Prime Minister Shinzō Abe made a visit to Yasukuni Shrine and Chinreisha. The visit sparked admonition from the Chinese government, which called Abe's visits to Yasukuni "an effort to glorify the Japanese militaristic history of external invasion and colonial rule ... and to challenge the outcome of World War II," as well as regret from Russia. The US embassy in Tokyo said it was disappointed with Abe's actions and that his visit would exacerbate tensions with Japan's neighbours. The United States urged Japan to improve strained relations with neighboring countries in the aftermath of Abe's controversial visit to Yasukuni Shrine. South Korea's culture minister, Yoo Jin-ryong, criticized Abe by saying that his visit "hurts not only the ties between South Korea and Japan, but also fundamentally damages the stability and co-operation in north-east Asia." In an official statement, Abe explained that he wished to "report before the souls of the war dead how my administration has worked for one year and to renew the pledge that Japan must never wage a war again. It is not my intention at all to hurt the feelings of the Chinese and Korean people."

 2014
 January: A poll by the conservative-leaning Sankei Shimbun found that only 38.1% of respondents approved of the most recent visit by Abe, while 53% disapproved, a majority of whom cited harm to Japan's foreign relations as their reason. At the same time, 67.7% of respondents said they were not personally convinced by Chinese and Korean criticism of the visit. However, another poll in 2015 by Genron NPO found that 15.7% of respondents disapproved of visits in general by Prime Ministers while 66% of respondents saw no problem, particularly if they were done in private (which was a decrease from 68.2% the year before).
 April: Canadian singer Justin Bieber paid a visit to the war shrine. After coming under heavy criticism from Chinese and South Korean fans, he apologized for posting a photo of his visit, claiming to have not known about the background surrounding the shrine.
 August 15: Three cabinet ministers visited the shrine to mark the 69th anniversary of the surrender of Japan in World War II. Prime Minister Shinzo Abe however chose not to.
 2015
 November 23: An explosion at a public toilet in the war shrine caused some damage to the ceiling and wall of the bathroom near the south gate of the shrine
 2018
 Chinese actor Zhang Zhehan took photos of himself posing in front of cherry blossom trees back in March 2018. He followed the Sakura route suggested by state sponsored news agencies such as People's Network. In August 2021, the background architecture of one of the photos was recognized as Saikan (office area of the Shrine). After the photos became viral and sparked outrage in China, Zhang issued an apology. However, multiple media agencies and majority of people still accused him of betrayal to the national dignity. The photos resulted in 22 brands terminating their endorsements of Zhang. His upcoming films and television shows also terminated all of their associations with him. The China Association of Performing Arts (CAPA) then called for a total entertainment ban on Zhang. Several Chinese music and streaming platforms removed his music, television and film works. Chinese social media platforms Sina Weibo and TikTok deleted his studio and personal accounts.

Annual celebrations

 January 1:
 0 a.m. 
 8 a.m. 
 January 2: 
 January 7:  (Service of worshipping toward Musashi Imperial Graveyard's Musashino no Misasagi, which is the Imperial mausoleum of the Shōwa Emperor)
 January 30:  (Service of worshipping toward Nochi no Tsukinowa no Higashi no Misasagi, which is the mausoleum of Emperor Kōmei)
 February 11:  (National Foundation Day)—Anniversary of the day on which Japan's first Emperor, Emperor Jimmu, is said to have founded the Japanese nation.
 February 17: 
 February 23:  (birthday of the current emperor)
 April 21–23: 
 April 21: 
 April 22: 
 April 19: , 
 April 29:  — Emperor Shōwa's birthday
 June 29:
 10 a.m.  (Founding Day) Commemoration of the founding of Yasukuni Jinja
 2 p.m. 
 June 30: 
 July 13–16:  (Mitama Festival)— A mid-summer celebration of the spirits of the ancestors. The entry walk is decorated with 40 foot high walls of more than 30,000 lanterns, and thousands of visitors come to pay respects to their lost relatives and friends.
 July 13: 
 July 14: 
 July 15: 
 July 16: 
 July 30:  (Service of worshipping toward Fushimi Momoyama no Misasagi, which is the mausoleum of Emperor Meiji)
 October 17:  (Service of worshipping toward Ise Jingū Kannamesai)
 October 17–20:  (annual autumn festival)
 October 17:  (Purifying ceremony), 
 October 18: 
 October 19: 
 October 20: ,  (feast)
 November 3:  (Emperor Meiji's birthday)
 November 23:  (Festival of First Fruits)
 December 25:  (Worship of Tama-no-misasagi for Emperor Taishō), Susuharaishiki (Sweeping soot ceremony)
 December 31:  (Grand Purification Ceremony),  (Year-End Ritual)
 The first, 11th and 21st day of each month: 

Enshrined deities
There are over 2,466,000 enshrined kami (deities) listed in the Yasukuni's Symbolic Registry of Divinities. This list includes soldiers, as well as women and students who were involved in relief operations in the battlefield or worked in factories for the war effort. There are neither ashes nor spirit tablets in the shrine. Enshrinement is not exclusive to people of Japanese descent. Yasukuni Shrine has enshrined 27,863 Taiwanese and 21,181 Koreans. Many more kami – those who fought in opposition to imperial Japan, as well as all war dead regardless of nationality – are enshrined at Chinreisha.

Eligible categories
As a general rule, the enshrined are limited to military personnel who were killed while serving Japan during armed conflicts. Civilians who were killed during a war are not included, apart from a handful of exceptions. A deceased must fall into one of the following categories for enshrinement in the honden:

 Military personnel, and civilians serving for the military, who were:
 killed in action, or died as a result of wounds or illnesses sustained while on duty outside the Home Islands (and within the Home Islands after September 1931)
 missing and presumed to have died as a result of wounds or illnesses sustained while on duty
 died as a result of war crime tribunals which have been ratified by the San Francisco Peace Treaty
 Civilians who participated in combat under the military and died from resulting wounds or illnesses (includes residents of Okinawa)
 Civilians who died, or are presumed to have died, in Soviet labor camps during and after the war
 Civilians who were officially mobilized or volunteered (such as factory workers, mobilized students, Japanese Red Cross nurses and anti air-raid volunteers) who were killed while on duty
 Crew who were killed aboard Merchant Navy vessels
 Crew who were killed due to the sinking of exchange ships (e.g. Awa Maru)
 Okinawan schoolchildren evacuees who were killed (e.g. the sinking of Tsushima Maru)
 Officials of the governing bodies of Karafuto Prefecture, Kwantung Leased Territory, Governor-General of Korea and Governor-General of Taiwan

Although new names of soldiers killed during World War II are added to the shrine list every year, no one who was killed due to conflicts after Japan signed the San Francisco Peace Treaty that formally ended World War II in 1951 has been qualified for enshrinement. Therefore, the shrine does not include members of the Japanese Self-Defense Forces which was established after the peace treaty.

Enshrinement is carried out unilaterally by the shrine without consultation of surviving family members and in some cases against the stated wishes of the family members. Some families from foreign countries such as South Korea have requested that their relatives be delisted on the grounds that enshrining someone against their beliefs in life constitutes an infringement of the Constitution.

Conflicts
Japan has participated in 16 other conflicts since the Boshin War in 1869. The following table chronologically lists the number of people enshrined as kami at the honden (as of October 17, 2004) from each of these conflicts.

The Yasukuni shrine does not include the Tokugawa shogunate's forces (particularly from the Aizu domain) or rebel forces who died during the Boshin War or Satsuma Rebellion because they are considered enemies of the emperor. They are enshrined at Chinreisha.

Precinct

There are a multitude of facilities within the 6.25 hectare grounds of the shrine, as well as several structures along the 4 hectare causeway. Though other shrines in Japan also occupy large areas, Yasukuni is different because of its recent historical connections. The Yūshūkan museum is just the feature that differentiate Yasukuni from other Shinto shrines. The following lists describe many of these facilities and structures.

Shrine structures
On the shrine grounds, there are several important religious structures. The shrine's haiden, Yasukuni's main prayer hall where worshipers come to pray, was originally built in 1901 in styles of Irimoya-zukuri, Hirairi, and Doubanbuki (copper roofing) in order to allow patrons to pay their respects and make offerings. This building's roof was renovated in 1989. The white screens hanging off the ceiling are changed to purple ones on ceremonial occasions.

The honden is the main shrine where Yasukuni's enshrined deities reside. Built in 1872 and refurbished in 1989, it is where the shrine's priests perform Shinto rituals. The building is generally closed to the public.

Reception and waiting rooms are available for individuals and groups who wish to worship in the Main Shrine.

It houses the —a handmade Japanese paper document that lists the names of all the kami enshrined and worshiped at Yasukuni Shrine. It was built of quakeproof concrete in 1972 with a private donation from Emperor Shōwa.

In addition to Yasukuni's main shrine buildings, there are also two peripheral shrines located on the precinct.  is a small shrine that was first established in Kyoto by sympathizers of the imperial loyalists that were killed during the early weeks of the civil war that erupted during the Meiji Restoration. Seventy years later, in 1931, it was moved directly south of Yasukuni Shrine's honden. Its name, Motomiya ("Original Shrine"), references the fact that it was essentially a prototype for the current Yasukuni Shrine. The second peripheral shrine is the Chinreisha. This small shrine was constructed in 1965, directly south of the Motomiya. It is dedicated to those not enshrined in the honden—those killed by wars or incidents worldwide, regardless of nationality. It has a festival on July 13.

Torii and Mon (gates)
There are several different torii and  gates located on both the causeway and shrine grounds. When moving through the grounds from east to west, the first torii visitors encounter is the Daiichi Torii (Ōtorii). This large steel structure was the largest torii in Japan when it was first erected in 1921 to mark the main entrance to the shrine. It stands approximately 25 meters tall and 34 meters wide and is the first torii. The current iteration of this torii was erected in 1974 after the original was removed in 1943 due to weather damage. This torii was recently repainted.

The Daini Torii (Seidō Ōtorii) is the second torii encountered on the westward walk to the shrine. It was erected in 1887 to replace a wooden one which had been erected earlier. This is the largest bronze torii in Japan. A 6-meter tall hinoki cypress gate, it was first built in 1934 and restored in 1994. Each of its two doors bears a Chrysanthemum Crest measuring 1.5 meters in diameter. It was recently rebuilt of cypress harvested in Saitama Prefecture in 2006.

In addition to the three torii and one gate that lead to the main shrine complex, there are a few others that mark other entrances to the shrine grounds. The Ishi Torii is a large stone torii located on the south end of the main causeway. It was erected in 1932 and marks the entrance to the parking lots. The Kitamon and Minamimon are two areas that mark the north and south entrances, respectively, into the Yasukuni Shrine complex. The Minamimon is marked by a small wooden gateway.

Memorials
 Irei no Izumi (Soul-Comforting Spring): This modern looking monument is a spring dedicated to those who suffered from or died of thirst in battle.
 Statue of War Widow with Children: This statue honors the mothers who raised children in the absence of fathers lost at war. It was donated to the shrine in 1974 by these mothers' children.
 Statue of Kamikaze Pilot: A bronze statue representing a kamikaze pilot stands to the left of the Yūshūkan's entrance. A small plaque to the left of the statue was donated by the Tokkōtai Commemoration Peace Memorial Association in 2005. It lists the 5,843 men who died while executing suicide attacks against Allied naval vessels in World War II.
 Statue of Ōmura Masujirō: Created by Okuma Ujihiro in 1893, this statue is Japan's first Western-style bronze statue. It honors Ōmura Masujirō, a man who is known as the "Father of the Modern Japanese Army."

 Monument of Justice Radha Binod Pal: This newer monument was erected at Yasukuni Shrine in 2005. It honours Indian Bengali judge Radha Binod Pal, the lone justice on the International Military Tribunal for the Far East's trials of Japanese war crimes committed during World War II to find all the defendants not guilty. On April 29, 2005, Indian Prime Minister Manmohan Singh told his counterpart Koizumi Junichiro that "the dissenting judgement of Justice Radha Binod Pal is well known to the Japanese people and will always symbolise the affection and regard our people have for your country."
 Statues honoring horses, carrier pigeons and dogs killed in war service: These three life-sized bronze statues were all donated at different times during the second half of the 20th century. The first of the three that was donated, the horse statue was placed at the Yasukuni Shrine in 1958 to honor the memory of the horses that were utilized by the Japanese military. Presented in 1982, the statue depicting a pigeon atop a globe honors the homing pigeons of the military. The last statue, donated in March 1992, depicts a German shepherd and commemorates the soldiers' canine comrades. Opened, full bottles of water are often left at these statues.

  (Monument for the dead in Hitachi Maru Incident)
  (Monument of Tanaka squad)
  (Monument of Kempeitai (Military police corps))
  (Monument of Imperial Rescript to Soldiers and Sailors, which is a Shōchoku (imperial edict) and code of ethics that Emperor Meiji issued to soldiers of the army and the navy on January 4, 1882)

Other buildings and structures

(from Kudanshita Station)

  (Stone pillar on which the shrine name is engraved)
  – near the Daiichi Torii
 Red stone – near the Daiichi Torii
  (The stone of battle site)
  (Tall lantern) – the largest tōrō in Japan
  – Ōtemizusha, which means large temizuya (main purification font), was established in 1940.
 Dovecote (shirohato kyusha): Almost 300 white doves live and are bred in a special dovecote located on the grounds of Yasukuni Shrine.
  (North gate)
 Nōgakudo (Noh Theater): Originally built in Shiba Park, Tokyo in 1881, and moved to Yasukuni Shrine in 1903. Noh dramas and traditional Japanese dance are performed on its stage in honor of the resident divinities.
 {{nihongo|Saikan (Purification Retreat) Shamusho (Shrine Office)|斎館社務所}}
 
  (Yasukuni Archives): Opened on October 7, 1999, archives more than 100,000 volumes including reference material that describes the circumstances under which the divinities enshrined in Yasukuni Shrine died, as well as source material for research on modern history.
 Yūshūkan: Originally built in 1882, this museum is located to the north of the main hall. Its name is taken from a saying – "a virtuous man always selects to associate with virtuous people." The building was repaired and expanded in 2002. The museum is a facility to stores and exhibit relics, and it also houses the weaponry of the Imperial Japanese Navy, notably including a Zero Fighter plane and Kaiten suicide torpedo. The museum has come into great controversy owing to its revisionist depiction of Japanese history, particularly of the militarist period from 1931 to 1945, in which it is perceived as denying Japanese war crimes and glorifying Japan's militarist past.
 Shinchi Teien: This Japanese style strolling garden was created in the early Meiji Era. Its centerpiece is a small waterfall located in a serene pond. It was refurbished in 1999.
 Sumo Ring: In 1869, a sumo wrestling exhibition was held at Yasukuni Shrine in order to celebrate the shrine's establishment. Since then, exhibitions involving many professional sumo wrestlers, including several grand champions (yokozuna) take place at the Spring Festival almost every year. The matches are free of charge.
 
  (Teahouse)
  (Teahouse)
  (Teahouse): The Kōuntei is used as a tea ceremony school room by the Urasenke from Monday to Saturday, and was used for manufacturing the Yasukuni (Kudan) sword before World War II.
  (Yasukuni clock tower)

List of priests

Guji (Chief priests): term of office
 : 16 July 1879 – 6 February 1891 (died in office)
 : 17 February 1891 – 28 April 1909
 : 29 March 1909 – 21 April 1939
 : 21 April 1938 – 17 January 1946
 : 25 January 1946 – 20 March 1978 (died in office)
 : 1 July 1978 – 31 March 1992
 : 1 April 1992 – 20 May 1997
 : 21 May 1997 – 10 September 2004
 : 11 September 2004 – 7 January 2009 (died in office)
 : 15 June 2009 – 19 January 2013
 : 19 January 2013 – present (a great-grandson of Yoshinobu Tokugawa, the last Tokugawa shogun)

Gon-guji (associate chief priests): term of office
 : 16 April 1938 – 3 October 1945
 : 16 November 1945 – 30 June 1948
 : 26 April 1948 (interim)
 : 31 August 1948 – 9 February 1979
 : 9 February 1979 – 16 July 1982
 : 16 July 1981 – 1 November 1984
 : 1 November 1984 – 17 November 1989
 : 1 August 1985 – 5 November 1990
 : 1 November 1990 – 20 May 1997
 : 21 May 1997 – 8 September 2009
 : 19 January 2000 – 31 October 2003
 : 1 June 2004 –
 : 1 November 2009 – present

Organization
Yasukuni shrine is an individual religious corporation and does not belong to the Association of Shinto Shrines.
Yasukuni shrine has departments listed below. The  controls the overall system, and the  assists the Gūji.

Cultural references to Yasukuni shrine

Bank notes
 1942–1948: Empire of Japan 50 sen banknote

Postage stamps
 Japanese 17 sen stamp (1943)
 Japanese 27 sen stamp (1945)
 Japanese 1 yen stamp (1946)

Scenic postmarks

Popular music
  (Singers: Masaru Shio, Yuriko Futaba etc.)
  (Singer: Chiyoko Shimakura)

Plays
  (The cherry blossoms of a same period)

Books
 1881:  (The chronology of Bukō (Edo, Musashi Province), 2nd volume) (Author:)
 1863–1872:  (The diary of Masaomi Hirosawa)
 1868–1877:  (The diary of Kido Takayoshi) (Author: Kido Takayoshi)
 1905:  (History of Yasukuni Shrine)
 1905–1907:  (I Am a Cat) (Author: Natsume Sōseki)
 1911:  (History of Yasukuni Shrine) (Authors: Terauchi Masatake)
 1917:  (My thirty years in Tokyo) (Author:Katai Tayama)

Posters
 1871:  (Big French circus on the grounds of Shokonsha (Yasukuni) shrine)

Swords

About 8,100 "Yasukuni swords" were manufactured in the grounds of the Yasukuni Shrine between 1933 and 1945.

See also

 List of Shinto shrines
 Tawau Japanese War Memorial

References

Sources 
 Nelson, John. "Social Memory as Ritual Practice: Commemorating Spirits of the Military Dead at Yasukuni Shinto Shrine". Journal of Asian Studies 62, 2 (May 2003): 445–467.
 Ponsonby-Fane, Richard. (1963).  Vicissitudes of Shinto. Kyoto: Ponsonby Memorial Society. OCLC 36655
 Pye, Michael: "Religion and Conflict in Japan with Special Reference to Shinto and Yasukuni Shrine". Diogenes 50:3 (2003), S. 45–59.
 Saaler, Sven: Politics, Memory and Public Opinion: The History Textbook Controversy and Japanese Society. München: Iudicium, 2005. .
 Shirk, Susan L. China: Fragile Superpower: How China's Internal Politics Could Derail Its Peaceful Rise. Oxford University Press, US. 2007. .

Further reading
 Breen, John. "The Dead and the Living in the Land of Peace: A Sociology of the Yasukuni Shrine". Mortality 9, 1 (February 2004): 76–93.
 Breen, John. Yasukuni, the War Dead and the Struggle for Japan's Past. Columbia University Press, 2008. .
 Nelson, John. "Social Memory as Ritual Practice: Commemorating Spirits of the Military Dead at Yasukuni Shinto Shrine". Journal of Asian Studies 62, 2 (May 2003): 445–467.
 
 

Regarding its controversy
 Ijiri, Hidenori. "Sino-Japanese Controversies since the 1972 Diplomatic Normalization". China Quarterly 124 (Dec 1990): 639–661.
 Shibuichi, Daiki. "The Yasukuni Dispute and the Politics of Identity of Japan: Why All the Fuss?" Asian Survey 45, 2 (March–April 2005): 197–215.
 Tamamoto, Masaru. "A Land Without Patriots: The Yasukuni Controversy and Japanese Nationalism". World Policy Journal 18, 3 (Fall 2001): 33–40.
 Yang, Daqing. "Mirror for the Future of the History Card? Understanding the 'History Problem'" in Chinese-Japanese Relations in the Twenty-first Century: Complementarity and Conflict, edited by Marie Söderberg, 10–31. New York: Routledge, 2002.

External links

 
 
 
 
 
 
Wheelchair accessibility information on Yasukuni Shrine

Monuments and memorials in Japan
Buildings and structures in Chiyoda, Tokyo
Buildings of the Meiji period
Shinto shrines in Tokyo
Empire of Japan
Religious buildings and structures completed in 1869
1869 establishments in Japan
Religious organizations established in 1869
19th century in Tokyo
Anti-Japanese sentiment in China
Anti-Japanese sentiment in Korea
Anti-Chinese sentiment in Japan
Anti-Korean sentiment in Japan
Japanese imperialism and colonialism
Association of Shinto Shrines
World War II memorials in Japan
Shinto new religious movements
Gokoku shrines
State Shinto